Vivian Julius "Vee" Green (October 9, 1900 – May 12, 1967) was an American football player, coach of football, basketball, and baseball, and college athletics administrator. He served as the head football coach at Oklahoma City University from 1928 to 1932 and at Drake University from 1933 to 1946. Green was also the head basketball coach at Oklahoma City from 1930 to 1933 and at Drake from 1944 to 1946, tallying a career college basketball mark of 32–41. A native of Urbana, Illinois, Green played college football at the University of Illinois at Urbana–Champaign from 1922 to 1923. He played as a center and was a teammate of Red Grange. 

Later in his life, Green did color commentary and football analysis for the AM station WHO in Des Moines, Iowa, including broadcasts alongside Jim Zabel. In the fall of 1966, Green was diagnosed with glioblastoma. Green died on May 12, 1967, from brain cancer.

Head coaching record

College football

Personal life 
Green married Iowan Lois Hardaway on February 5, 1954. They had 3 children.

References

External links
 

1900 births
1967 deaths
American football centers
Basketball coaches from Illinois
Drake Bulldogs athletic directors
Drake Bulldogs baseball coaches
Drake Bulldogs football coaches
Drake Bulldogs men's basketball coaches
Illinois Fighting Illini football players
Louisville Colonels (NFL) players
Oklahoma City Stars athletic directors
Oklahoma City Chiefs football coaches
Oklahoma City Stars men's basketball coaches
High school football coaches in Illinois
People from Urbana, Illinois